Canine gastropexy is a surgical procedure performed most commonly in large breed dogs to prevent gastric dilatation volvulus (GDV), commonly known as bloat.  GDV is a life-threatening condition in which the stomach flips over and expands, trapping air and gases in the stomach.  Circulation to the stomach and spleen is subsequently interrupted, resulting in shock which can be fatal.

In gastropexy, the stomach is tacked to the right side of the abdominal wall, so it cannot shift or twist.  The procedure can be conducted laparoscopically.

Gastropexy is an effective preventive against death from GDV in large dogs.  In studies of dogs treated for GDV, of those with gastropexy, only 4.3% had a re-occurrence of GDV, compared to 54.5% of those dogs that did not have a gastropexy.

See also
Gastropexy

References

Dog health
Veterinary procedures